Fritessaus or frietsaus ("fries sauce") is a Dutch accompaniment to French fries, served popularly nationwide. It is similar to mayonnaise, but with at most 25% fat, is leaner and usually sweeter than mayonnaise. Mayonnaise in the Netherlands is required by the Warenwet (Wares law) of 1998 to contain at least 70% fat and at least 5% egg yolk before it may be called mayonnaise.

Preparation 
Although it is usually bought pre-made, fritesaus can be produced at home in a process similar to that which is used to make mayonnaise. It is usually thinned with water or other suitable liquids.

Most recipes use lime juice. Chives and capers are common additions.

See also
 List of dips
 List of sauces

References 

Condiments
Sauces
Mayonnaise
Dutch cuisine
Dutch words and phrases